The Constitution provides for freedom of religion, and the Government generally respects this right in practice; however, the 1992 Law on Religions, which codifies religious freedoms, contains restrictions that inhibit the activities of unregistered religious groups. Although the law was amended in 2002, many of the restrictions remain in place. The law provides for freedom of religious practice, including each person's right to profess his or her religion in any form. It also protects the confidentiality of the confessional, allows denominations to establish associations and foundations, and states that the Government may not interfere in the religious activities of denominations. The law specifies that "in order to organize and function", religious organizations must be registered with the Government, and unregistered groups may not own property, engage employees, or obtain space in public cemeteries in their own names.

There is no state religion; however, the Metropolis of Chişinău and Moldova receives some favoured treatment from the Government. The Metropolitan of Chişinău and Moldova has a diplomatic passport. Other high-ranking Orthodox Church officials also reportedly have diplomatic passports issued by the Government. For this reason, scholars claimed that an approach exclusively centred on the religious freedom juridical frame would appear inaccurate. 

The procedures for registering a religious organization are the same for all groups. In 2002, Parliament adopted amendments to the Law on Religions. A religious organization wishing to register must present a declaration of creation, by-laws, and an explanation of its basic religious beliefs to the State Service on Religious Issues. The State Service on Religious Issues enters the religious organization into the Register of Religions within 30 working days. Under the new procedures, at the request of the State Service on Religious Issues, a court can annul the recognition of the religious organization if the organization "carries out activities that harm the independence, sovereignty, integrity, and security of the Republic of Moldova, the public order, or are connected with political activities." The amendments also provide that religious organizations are prohibited from including in their by-laws any provisions that would violate the Constitution or any other laws.

The Government has recognized and registered 21 religious organizations, many of which are umbrella organizations with sub-entities throughout the country. Although the 2002 amendments to the Law on Religions were intended to simplify the registration process and make the process essentially automatic, the State Service on Religious Issues continues to deny the registration of somegroups, such as the Spiritual Organization of Muslims. Members of this organization repeatedly tried to register with the State Service on Religious Issues and their applications were denied because the State Service claimed their documents were not in order. A number of other organizations have been denied registration or encountered difficulties in connection with their registration applications.

In 1999, amendments to the Law on Religions legalizing proselytizing went into effect. However, the law explicitly forbids "abusive proselytizing", which is defined as an attempt to influence an individual's religious faith through violence or abuse of authority.

In 2002, a new draft Law on Religions, which contained numerous contentious provisions, was circulated. The draft law originally contained numerous restrictive measures. The draft law has since been revised, and it appears that many of the restrictive articles have been deleted.

In February 2003, a new Law on Combating Extremism was passed by Parliament and took effect in March 2003. Critics of the law raised concerns that the law could be used to abuse opposition organizations, which could include religious organizations or individuals who may support or have political ties to certain parties. But in practice this law had never been used against any religious organizations.

A new Criminal Code, adopted by Parliament in April 2002 and in effect since June 2003, includes an article which permits punishment for "preaching religious beliefs or fulfillment of religious rituals, which cause harm to the health of citizens, or other harm to their persons or rights, or instigate citizens not to participate in public life or of the fulfillment of their obligations as citizens." Drafters allegedly copied the passage almost word-for-word from the previous code, which was passed in 1961 when the country was part of the Soviet Union. No organization was prosecuted under this new code.

Article 200 of the Administrative Offenses Code, which was adopted in 1985, prohibits any religious activities of registered or unregistered religions that violate current legislation. The article also allows for the expulsion of foreign citizens who engage in religious activities without the consent of authorities. The Spiritual Organization of Muslims has reported being fined under this provision of law for holding its religious services in a location registered to a charitable organization. The Government charged that their activities are not in line with the stated activities and purposes of the charitable organization.

Foreign missionaries are permitted to enter the country for 90 days on a tourist visa. They have no advantages over other foreigners who wish to stay in the country for longer periods.

In 2000, Parliament amended the Law on Education to make "moral and spiritual instruction" mandatory for primary school students and optional for secondary and university students. The program was introduced gradually, beginning in 2001, for first graders, and then in 2002 and 2003 for second and third graders, respectively. In some schools, there is a class specifically on religion, although this course is conditioned on a request and approval by the parents, and the availability of funds to cover the cost of the course. There are a number of theological institutes, seminaries, and other places of religious education in the country.

Two public schools and a kindergarten are open only to Jewish students, and a kindergarten in Chişinău has a special "Jewish group". These schools receive the same funding as other state schools and are supplemented by financial support from the community. However, Jewish students are not restricted to these schools. There are no comparable schools for other religious faiths and no reports of such schools for other religious faiths. Agudath Israel operates a private boys' yeshiva and a girls' yeshiva, both licensed by the Ministry of Education. The total enrollment of both schools is fewer than 100 students. Total enrollment for all Jewish related schools, including those operated by Agudath Israel and public schools, is approximately 300.

The authorities in Transnistria also impose registration requirements that negatively affect religious groups and have denied registration to some groups. In April, a new draft Law on Religions, which reportedly contained numerous contentious provisions, was brought before the Transnistrian Supreme Soviet. Following strong objections from the Orthodox Bishop of Tiraspol and some legislators, the draft was sent back for revisions. Despite these protests, the objectionable provisions of the draft law are reportedly strongly supported by a number of high-level authorities in Transnistria.

Restrictions on Religious Freedom 

The Law on Religions contains restrictions that have inhibited the activities of unregistered religious groups, and the Government continued to deny registration to some religious groups.

Unregistered religious organizations are not permitted to buy land or obtain construction permits for churches or seminaries. In some cases, members of unregistered religious groups hold services in homes, nongovernmental organization (NGO) offices, and other locations. In other cases, the groups obtain property and permits in the names of individual members. Individual churches or branches of officially registered religious organizations are not obliged to register with local authorities; however, the local branch must register locally if it wants to make legal transactions as a legal body, including the ability to receive donations in its name.

Between the two autonomous Eastern Orthodox churches (Moldovan Orthodox Church belonging to the Russian Orthodox Church, and Metropolis of Bessarabia belonging to the Romanian Orthodox Church) there is an ongoing politically charged succession dispute, which, from an ecclesiastical point of view, is an administrative only issue (subject to canon laws), not a theological one, the two belonging respectively to two autocephalous Churches (of Russia and of Romania), which are within the Eastern Orthodox communion.

Thus, in 2001, the Government declared the Moldovan Orthodox Church the successor of the pre-World War II Romanian Orthodox Church for purposes of all property ownership. The Metropolis of Bessarabia was reactivated in 1992 (after Moldova declared independence in 1991) when a number of priests broke away from the Moldovan Orthodox Church, and was only officially recognized in 2002, after years of being denied recognition. The dispute was brought in front of the European Court of Human Rights (ECHR) which ruled in 2004 in favor of the Metropolis of Bessarabia as the "spiritual, canonical, historical successor of the Metropolitan See of Bessarabia which functioned till 1944, including". In February 2004, the Supreme Court repealed the Government's 2001 decision. In April 2004, in response to an appeal submitted by the Government, the Supreme Court rescinded its February ruling, making the Moldovan Orthodox Church once again the legal successor to the pre-World War II Romanian Orthodox Church. The Metropolis of Bessarabia, which regards itself as the legal and canonical successor to the pre-World War II Romanian Orthodox Church, being endorsed by the ECHR, does not accept this decision. The registration issue has political as well as religious overtones, since it raises the question of whether the Orthodox Church should be oriented toward the Moscow Patriarchate or the Bucharest Patriarchate.

In May 2002, after a long series of registration denials and legal appeals, the Supreme Court of Justice ruled that the Government must register the Church of the True Orthodox-Moldova, a branch of the Russian Orthodox Church Abroad, which is based in the United States. The State Service on Religious Issues failed to implement the decision in the stipulated 30 days and subsequently asked the Court for a 2-week extension to register the church. But after 3 weeks, instead of registering the church, the Service filed an extraordinary appeal with the Court of Appeals. The Court reviewed the appeal and declared that the Service was not allowed to file the appeal, since the case was made against the Government, not the Service. Within a couple of weeks another appeal from the Prime Minister was filed. In early 2004, the appeal was sent to the Supreme Court and was under examination at the end of the period covered by this report. The Church had submitted applications for registration in 1997, 1998, and 2000; the Government rejected these applications on various grounds.

Mormons 

The Mormons have continuously faced bureaucratic obstacles and have not yet obtained registration. They most recently applied for registration in January (2006?), and the State Service on Religious Issues requested further documentation in March. There has been no further action taken on their registration request, and the Mormons did not report any resistance or pressure from state authorities.

Muslims 

The State Service on Religious Issues has refused registration on numerous occasions to both the Spiritual Organization of Muslims and the Central Muslim Spiritual Board of Moldova (the latter associated with the Central Muslim Spiritual Board of Russia and CIS states). The Spiritual Organization of Muslims has filed a case against the Government for denying it registration with the European Court of Human Rights, and the case is awaiting review. The Central Muslim Spiritual Board of Moldova filed a complaint locally against the State Service on Religious Issues in 2002. The case was heard by the Court of Appeals, which decided in favor of the Muslim group in September 2003 and ordered the Government to register the organization. The Government subsequently appealed the decision to the Supreme Court, which returned the case to the Court of Appeals for reexamination. On March 15, 2004, the Court of Appeals began reexamining the case.

The law provides for restitution to politically repressed or exiled persons of property that was confiscated during the successive Nazi and Soviet regimes. In practice this regulation has been extended to religious communities; however, the Moldovan Orthodox Church has been favored over other religious groups. The Church had little difficulty in recovering nearly all of its property and, in cases where property was destroyed, the Government offered alternative compensation. The Church has recovered churches, schools, hospitals, orphanages, and administrative properties. Property disputes among the Moldovan and Bessarabian Churches have not been resolved. The Jewish community has experienced mixed results in its effort to recover its property; however, by 2004 there were no pending restitution cases for the Jewish community.

Situation in Transnistria 

The Transnistrian authorities have developed a new textbook that is to be used at all school levels, which reportedly contains negative and defamatory information regarding the Jehovah's Witnesses.

Authorities in Transnistria used registration requirements and other legal mechanisms to restrict the religious freedom of some religious groups. Evangelical religious groups meeting in private homes reportedly have been told that they do not have the correct permits to use their residences as venues for religious services. In the past, they and other non-Orthodox groups generally were not allowed to rent property and often were harassed during religious services.

In 1997, the authorities in Transnistria announced that they would annul the registration of the Jehovah's Witnesses. The Jehovah's Witnesses in Transnistria were originally registered in 1991, and the church was reregistered by the "Ministry of Justice" in 1994 and 1997. However, in 1997 the "President's Commissioner for Religions and Cults" sent official letters to public authorities falsely claiming that the activity of the Jehovah's Witnesses was banned and that their registration was annulled. Using the "President's Commissioner's" deceptive letter, authorities have repeatedly harassed the Jehovah's Witnesses, including halting the distribution of religious literature and refusing to approve a property request to build a house of worship. In 2001, the Jehovah's Witnesses lodged an official complaint with the "President" of Transnistria, and in 2002, they lodged a complaint with the Magistrate in Tiraspol against illegal actions taken by the "President's Commissioner for Religions and Cults." In July 2002, the "President's Commissioner for Religions and Cults" sent a letter to various government departments with instructions to consider the Jehovah's Witnesses as illegal until the case brought against them had been finalized. The Jehovah's Witnesses have lodged an official complaint and a counter lawsuit against the "President's Commissioner for Religions and Cults." Following several hearings, the Court has decided to suspend the trial until the liquidation case has been finalized. In December 2003, the Jehovah's Witnesses were informed that the two trials would be combined into one trial that would be heard by a panel of three judges. The case was being heard at the close of the period covered by this report.

The Baptist community in Transnistria remains unregistered. In previous years, the Baptists in Transnistria complained of increasing harassment from the authorities; however, in 2004 the Baptists reported no direct harassment. In addition authorities did not report threats to destroy the group's church, and the group continued to meet in the same building.

Pagan 
The Kishinev community a "Patrimonial Ring" ("Родовое Кольцо") unites adherents of Slavic vernacular religion.

Abuses of Religious Freedom

The Spiritual Organization of Muslims has reported regular harassment by the police. Members say the police often show up at their Friday prayers, which are held at a local Islamic organization's offices, checking participants' documents and taking pictures. On March 5, the police raided their meeting place after Friday prayers, detaining several members and subsequently deporting three Syrian citizens for not having proper legal residence documents. The authorities claimed the religious services were illegal because the organization is not registered, and the place they were meeting was registered to a charity and was not being used for its stated purpose.

In several cases, members of Jehovah's Witnesses reported being detained and fined for preaching their religion. In the village of Cruzesti, the mayor and residents of the village physically blocked members of Jehovah's Witnesses from the public cemetery for not respecting the customs of the Orthodox religion.

The Jehovah's Witnesses in Transnistria have reported several incidents of administrative fines and unjust arrests of their members. In all reported cases, the charges have been dropped in appeals at the level of the Supreme Court.

Societal Attitudes 

The generally amicable relations among religions in society contributed to religious freedom. The dispute between the Moldovan and Bessarabian Orthodox Churches is ongoing; however, the adherents of the respective Churches do not interfere with others' freedom to worship.

Jehovah's Witnesses from various regions of the country have complained that their ability to practice their religion freely has been impeded by local town councils and Orthodox priests and adherents. They have also reported physical and verbal abuse by local townspeople at the instigation of local Orthodox priests.

There were a few reports of negative press articles about non-Orthodox religions. The Jehovah's Witnesses have been the target of articles criticizing their beliefs and legitimacy, and the Baptists in Transnistria claim press reports about their religion have been negative.

Between March 14 and March 30, more than 70 tombstones were desecrated in the Jewish cemetery in Tiraspol. Swastikas and other Nazi symbols were painted on monuments, and many tombstones were damaged beyond repair. On May 4, unknown persons attempted to set the Tiraspol synagogue on fire by throwing a Molotov cocktail onto the premises near a local gas supply. The attack failed when passers-by extinguished the fire. Transnistrian authorities believe the attacks were propagated by the same people and claim they are investigating the incidents.

References

Moldova
Religion in Moldova